Bambino the Clown is a 1947 picture book by Georges Schreiber. The story is about an Italian clown who entertains children. The book was a recipient of a 1948 Caldecott Honor for its illustrations.

References

1947 children's books
American picture books
Caldecott Honor-winning works
Viking Press books